Richards Independent School District is a public school district based in the unincorporated community of Richards, Texas, United States. Located in Grimes County, the district also serves northwestern Montgomery County and a small portion of southwestern Walker County. The district has one campus with a main building housing both Richards High (Grades 7-12) and Richards Elementary (Grades K-6), a gym, and an agriculture building.

In 2018–2019, the district received a score of 82 out of 100 from the Texas Education Agency. The district received a score of 72 the previous year.

References

External links

 Richards ISD
 District map

School districts in Grimes County, Texas
School districts in Walker County, Texas
School districts in Montgomery County, Texas